Hab is a khum (commune) of Koas Krala District in Battambang Province in north-western Cambodia.

Villages

 Hab
 Chambak
 Sambour
 Sameakki
 Trapeang Dang Tuek
 Kouk Trom
 Slaeng Chuor

References

Communes of Battambang province
Koas Krala District